Ahmed Masoud (born 15 December 1991), is an Egyptian footballer who plays for Egyptian Premier League side Al Masry as a goalkeeper.

References

1991 births
Living people
Egyptian footballers
Egyptian Premier League players
Telephonat Beni Suef SC players
Misr Lel Makkasa SC players
Al Masry SC players
Association football goalkeepers